Back on the Streets is the debut album by American rock singer/guitarist Donnie Iris, released in 1980. The single "Ah! Leah!" was a hit for Iris, reaching #29 on the U.S. Billboard Hot 100 chart and #19 on the U.S. Billboard Top Tracks chart.  The album was remastered and reissued on CD in 2021 by Rock Candy Records with two live bonus tracks from the 1981 Live EP.

Track listing

Side one
 "Agnes" (Avsec, Ierace) – 3:30
 "You're Only Dreaming" (Avsec, Ierace, McClain, Hoenes, Valentine) – 4:45
 "She's So Wild" (Avsec, Ierace, McClain, Hoenes, Valentine) – 2:35
 "Daddy Don't Live Here Anymore" (Avsec, Ierace) – 3:49
 "Too Young to Love" (Avsec) – 5:31

Side two
 "Ah! Leah!" (Mark Avsec, Dominic Ierace) – 3:46
 "I Can't Hear You" (Avsec, Ierace, Albritton McClain, Marty Hoenes, Kevin Valentine) – 3:40
 "Joking" (Avsec, Ierace) – 4:04
 "Shock Treatment" (Avsec) – 3:48
 "Back on the Streets" (Avsec, Ierace) – 3:36

Re-released October 1980 as MCA 3272 with sides one and two reversed.

2021 remastered CD reissue
 "Ah! Leah!" - 3:47
 "I Can't Hear You" - 3:40
 "Joking" - 4:05
 "Shock Treatment" - 3:49
 "Back on the Streets" - 3:38
 "Agnes" - 3:30
 "You're Only Dreaming" - 4:45
 "She's So Wild" - 2:35
 "Daddy Don't Live Here Anymore" - 3:50
 "Too Young to Love" - 5:34
 "Ah! Leah! (Live)" - 4:37
 "I Can't Hear You (Live)" - 3:41

Personnel

Donnie Iris and the Cruisers 
 Donnie Iris - lead and background vocals
 Mark Avsec - piano, synthesizers, vocals
 Marty Lee Hoenes - acoustic and electric guitars
 Albritton McClain - bass guitar
 Kevin Valentine - drums

Additional musicians 
 Kenny Blake - saxophone
 Robert Peckman - bass on "Shock Treatment"

Production 
 Executive Producer: Carl Maduri
 Producer: Mark Avsec
 Engineer: Jerry Reed

Chart positions 
Album - Billboard

Singles - Billboard

References 

Donnie Iris albums
1980 debut albums
Albums produced by Mark Avsec